Mtskheta-Mtianeti (literally "Mtskheta-Mountain Area") is a region (Mkhare) in eastern Georgia comprising the town of Mtskheta, which serves as a regional capital, together with its district and the adjoining mountainous areas. The western part of the region, namely the entire Akhalgori Municipality, is controlled by breakaway South Ossetia since the 2008 Russo-Georgian War.

Administrative divisions 
The Mtskheta-Mtianeti region officially comprises five municipalities, yet only four are effectively under Georgian authority:

See also
Subdivisions of Georgia

Notes

References

External links 
 The Regional Administration of Mtskheta-Mtianeti website

 
Regions of Georgia (country)